Markus Fuchs (born 23 June 1955 in Abtwil, Switzerland) is a Swiss show jumper who competed at five Olympics between 1988 and 2004. He was part of the Swiss team that won silver at the 2000 Olympics.

He is, jointly with shooter Gabriele Bühlmann, the seventh Swiss sportsperson to compete at five Olympics, after middle-distance runner Paul Martin, equestrians Henri Chammartin and Gustav Fischer, javelin thrower Urs von Wartburg, equestrian Christine Stückelberger, and Alpine skier Paul Accola.

At the European Show Jumping Championships, he came second in the individual event in 1999 on Tinka's Boy. He was also part of the Swiss teams that won gold in 1995, silver in 1999 and 2005, and bronze in 1987, 1989, 1991, and 2003.

Fuchs announced his retirement from competition on 6 June 2009. He became the coach of the Italian national team, which won a silver medal that same year in the European Show Jumping Championships (2009 Windsor).

See also
 List of athletes with the most appearances at Olympic Games

References

1955 births
Living people
Swiss male equestrians
Medalists at the 2000 Summer Olympics
Olympic medalists in equestrian
Olympic equestrians of Switzerland
Olympic silver medalists for Switzerland
Equestrians at the 1988 Summer Olympics
Equestrians at the 1992 Summer Olympics
Equestrians at the 1996 Summer Olympics
Equestrians at the 2000 Summer Olympics
Equestrians at the 2004 Summer Olympics
20th-century Swiss people
21st-century Swiss people